John Craig Wheeler (born 1943) is an American astronomer. He is the Samuel T. and Fern Yanagisawa Regents Professor of Astronomy at the University of Texas at Austin. He is known for his theoretical work on supernovae. He is a past president of the American Astronomical Society, a Fellow of that society, and a Fellow of the American Physical Society.

Early life and education 
Wheeler graduated from the  Massachusetts Institute of Technology in 1965 with a BS in physics. He was awarded his PhD in physics in 1969 from the University of Colorado. He then held a postdoctoral fellowship at the California Institute of Technology until 1971.

Career 
In 1971 Wheeler became an assistant professor in the Department of Astronomy at Harvard University. In 1974 he joined the Department of Astronomy at the University of Texas at Austin. He became the Samuel T. and Fern Yanagisawa Regents Professor of Astronomy in 1985.

Wheeler served as the President of the American Astronomical Society (AAS) from 2006 to 2008. He was elected a Fellow of the American Physical Society in 2007. In 2008, he became a Legacy Fellow of the AAS.

Based on the "Astronomy Bizarre" course he taught for non-majors, Wheeler published Cosmic Catastrophes: Supernovae, Gamma-ray Bursts, and Adventures in Hyperspace in 2000. The second edition,  Cosmic Catastrophes: Exploding Stars, Black Holes, and Mapping the Universe, was published in 2007. In 2019 he and David Branch received the Chambliss Astronomical Writing Award for their textbook Supernova Explosions.

Awards and honors 
 2007 Fellow of the American Physical Society
 2008 Legacy Fellow of the American Astronomical Society
 2019 Chambliss Astronomical Writing Award

Selected publications

Articles

Books

Science fiction

References

Further reading

External links
 Curriculum vitae
 Faculty website

American astronomers
American astrophysicists
1943 births
Living people
Massachusetts Institute of Technology alumni
University of Colorado alumni
Harvard University faculty
University of Texas at Austin faculty
Fellows of the American Astronomical Society
Fellows of the American Physical Society